Stanislav Dostál (born 20 June 1991) is a Czech football player, who currently plays for Trinity Zlín as a goalkeeper. He made his Czech First League debut for Zlín against Olomouc on 15 November 2008.

References

External links
 
 

1991 births
Living people
Czech footballers
Association football goalkeepers
Czech First League players
FC Fastav Zlín players